Knowlton Township is a township in Warren County, in the U.S. state of New Jersey. As of the 2020 United States census, the township's population was 2,894, a decrease of 161 (−5.3%) from the 2010 census count of 3,055, which in turn reflected an increase of 78 (+2.6%) from the 2,977 counted in the 2000 census.

History
Knowlton Township was created as a precinct by Royal charter from portions of Oxford Township on February 23, 1763, while the area was still part of Sussex County, and was incorporated as a township by an act of the New Jersey Legislature on February 21, 1798, and then became part of the newly created Warren County on November 20, 1824. Portions of the township were taken to form Hope Township (April 8, 1839) and Blairstown Township (April 14, 1845).

Knowlton's name is variously attributed to Thomas Knowlton, a Colonel in the Continental Army during the American Revolutionary War who was killed in action at the Battle of Harlem Heights, or to the knolls that characterize the area. In some older sources, the name is spelled "Knawltown".

The township is served by postal ZIP Codes in Columbia (07832) and Delaware (07833), although a small number of Knowlton residents receive postal deliveries via the Blairstown (07825) post office. Within the township are several small hamlets, including Browning, Deckers Ferry, Mount Pleasant, Polkville, Ramseyburg, Warrington and Knowlton itself.

Geography
According to the United States Census Bureau, the township had a total area of 25.33 square miles (65.60 km2), including 24.72 square miles (64.03 km2) of land and 0.60 square miles (1.56 km2) of water (2.38%). The township is located in the Kittatinny Valley which is a section of the Great Appalachian Valley that stretches  from Canada to Alabama.

Columbia (with a 2010 Census population of 229), Delaware (150) and Hainesburg (91) are unincorporated communities and census-designated places (CDPs) located within the township.

Other unincorporated communities, localities and place names located partially or completely within the township include Browning, Deckers Ferry, Mount Pleasant, Polkville, Ramseyburg and Warrington.

The township borders the Warren County municipalities of Blairstown Township, Hardwick Township, Hope Township and White Township.

Demographics

The Township's economic data (as is all of Warren County) is calculated by the US Census Bureau as part of the Allentown-Bethlehem-Easton, PA-NJ Metropolitan Statistical Area.

2010 census
 

The Census Bureau's 2006–2010 American Community Survey showed that (in 2010 inflation-adjusted dollars) median household income was $81,346 (with a margin of error of +/− $11,792) and the median family income was $86,708 (+/− $13,339). Males had a median income of $76,733 (+/− $8,158) versus $51,757 (+/− $3,961) for females. The per capita income for the Township was $35,440 (+/− $4,605). About 1.4% of families and 3.3% of the population were below the poverty line, including 3.1% of those under age 18 and 7.7% of those age 65 or over.

2000 census

As of the 2000 U.S. census, there were 2,977 people, 1,028 households, and 816 families residing in the township. The population density was 120.1 people per square mile (46.4/km2). There were 1,135 housing units at an average density of 45.8 per square mile (17.7/km2). The racial makeup of the township was 97.45% White, 0.40% African American, 0.07% Native American, 0.64% Asian, 0.47% from other races, and 0.97% from two or more races. Hispanic or Latino of any race were 1.85% of the population.

There were 1,028 households, out of which 40.0% had children under the age of 18 living with them, 69.1% were married couples living together, 6.6% had a female householder with no husband present, and 20.6% were non-families. 15.0% of all households were made up of individuals, and 7.1% had someone living alone who was 65 years of age or older. The average household size was 2.87 and the average family size was 3.21.

In the township the population was spread out, with 27.6% under the age of 18, 5.7% from 18 to 24, 31.3% from 25 to 44, 24.1% from 45 to 64, and 11.2% who were 65 years of age or older. The median age was 38 years. For every 100 females, there were 101.8 males. For every 100 females age 18 and over, there were 98.0 males.

The median income for a household in the township was $63,409, and the median income for a family was $72,130. Males had a median income of $46,250 versus $35,326 for females. The per capita income for the township was $24,631. About 1.5% of families and 3.5% of the population were below the poverty line, including 4.2% of those under age 18 and 1.3% of those age 65 or over.

Government

Local government 

Knowlton Township is governed under the Township form of New Jersey municipal government, one of 141 municipalities (of the 564) statewide that use this form, the second-most commonly used form of government in the state. The Township Committee is comprised of five members, who are elected directly by the voters at-large in partisan elections to serve three-year terms of office on a staggered basis, with either one or two seats coming up for election each year as part of the November general election in a three-year cycle. At an annual reorganization meeting, the Township Committee selects one of its members to serve as Mayor and another as Deputy Mayor.

, the Knowlton Township Committee is comprised of Mayor M. Adele Starrs (R, term on committee and as mayor ends December 31, 2022), Deputy Mayor Debra L. Shipps (R, term on committee ends 2023; term as deputy mayor ends 2022), Kathy Cuntala (R, 2024),  James Mazza (R, 2023), and Frank Van Horn (R, 2022).

Federal, state, and county representation 
Knowlton Township is located in the 7th Congressional District and is part of New Jersey's 24th state legislative district. 

Prior to the 2011 reapportionment following the 2010 Census, Knowlton Township had been in the 23rd state legislative district.

Politics
As of March 2011, there were a total of 2,008 registered voters in Knowlton Township, of which 418 (20.8% vs. 21.5% countywide) were registered as Democrats, 694 (34.6% vs. 35.3%) were registered as Republicans and 895 (44.6% vs. 43.1%) were registered as Unaffiliated. There as one voter registered to another party. Among the township's 2010 Census population, 65.7% (vs. 62.3% in Warren County) were registered to vote, including 85.7% of those ages 18 and over (vs. 81.5% countywide).

In the 2012 presidential election, Republican Mitt Romney received 833 votes (63.1% vs. 56.0% countywide), ahead of Democrat Barack Obama with 441 votes (33.4% vs. 40.8%) and other candidates with 19 votes (1.4% vs. 1.7%), among the 1,320 ballots cast by the township's 2,027 registered voters, for a turnout of 65.1% (vs. 66.7% in Warren County). In the 2008 presidential election, Republican John McCain received 918 votes (63.0% vs. 55.2% countywide), ahead of Democrat Barack Obama with 491 votes (33.7% vs. 41.4%) and other candidates with 25 votes (1.7% vs. 1.6%), among the 1,457 ballots cast by the township's 2,045 registered voters, for a turnout of 71.2% (vs. 73.4% in Warren County). In the 2004 presidential election, Republican George W. Bush received 948 votes (65.8% vs. 61.0% countywide), ahead of Democrat John Kerry with 469 votes (32.5% vs. 37.2%) and other candidates with 17 votes (1.2% vs. 1.3%), among the 1,441 ballots cast by the township's 1,899 registered voters, for a turnout of 75.9% (vs. 76.3% in the whole county).

In the 2013 gubernatorial election, Republican Chris Christie received 74.6% of the vote (671 cast), ahead of Democrat Barbara Buono with 22.8% (205 votes), and other candidates with 2.6% (23 votes), among the 915 ballots cast by the township's 2,040 registered voters (16 ballots were spoiled), for a turnout of 44.9%. In the 2009 gubernatorial election, Republican Chris Christie received 595 votes (63.8% vs. 61.3% countywide), ahead of Democrat Jon Corzine with 203 votes (21.8% vs. 25.7%), Independent Chris Daggett with 102 votes (10.9% vs. 9.8%) and other candidates with 13 votes (1.4% vs. 1.5%), among the 932 ballots cast by the township's 1,987 registered voters, yielding a 46.9% turnout (vs. 49.6% in the county).

Education 
Children in pre-kindergarten through sixth grade for public school attend Knowlton Township Elementary School as part of the Knowlton Township School District. As of the 2019–20 school year, the district, comprised of one school, had an enrollment of 155 students and 23.0 classroom teachers (on an FTE basis), for a student–teacher ratio of 6.7:1. In the 2016–17 school year, Knowlton had the 41st smallest enrollment of any school district in the state, with 192 students.

Students in public school for seventh through twelfth grades attend the North Warren Regional High School in Blairstown, a public secondary high school, serving students from the townships of Blairstown, Frelinghuysen, Hardwick and Knowlton. As of the 2019–20 school year, the high school had an enrollment of 752 students and 69.0 classroom teachers (on an FTE basis), for a student–teacher ratio of 10.9:1. The seats on the district's nine-member board of education are allocated based on the population of the constituent municipalities, with two seats assigned to Knowlton Township.

Students from the township and from all of Warren County are eligible to attend Ridge and Valley Charter School in Frelinghuysen Township (for grades K–8, with Knowlton students among those given admission preference) or Warren County Technical School in Washington borough (for 9–12), with special education services provided by local districts supplemented throughout the county by the Warren County Special Services School District in Oxford Township (for PreK–12).

Recreation
Tunnel Field is the primary recreational site in the township with several baseball and softball diamonds and soccer fields. Tunnel also has a play area (including swings and play area), a basketball court, tennis court, paved walking track, and concession stand. The field is located by Route 94 and is divided by the Lackawanna Cut-Off and is connected through an old tunnel (hence the name).

Transportation

Roads and highways

U.S. Route 46 runs for  through the township's southern portion. The Portland–Columbia Toll Bridge (part of Route 94), which is owned and operated by the Delaware River Joint Toll Bridge Commission, crosses the Delaware River and connects with Pennsylvania Route 611 in Portland, Pennsylvania.

Rail history
Much of Knowlton's development after 1850 can be traced to the presence of the five railroad lines that criss-crossed the township: the Delaware, Lackawanna & Western Railroad's Old Road and, later, the Lackawanna Cut-Off; the New York, Susquehanna and Western Railway; the Lehigh & New England Railroad; and the Blairstown Railway. In subsequent years, all of these rail lines have been abandoned. In their heyday, however, two rail lines and three railroads served the town of Delaware: the New York, Susquehanna and Western (formerly Blairstown) Railway; and the Old Road of the Delaware, Lackawanna and Western Railroad (which also had granted trackage rights to the Pennsylvania Railroad, technically a sixth railroad). The community of Columbia was also served by the NYS&W (Hainesburg also had a station), with the Lehigh and New England Railroad also passing through town.

In more recent years, development within Knowlton has been tied to the presence of U.S. Route 46 and, since the early 1970s, Interstate 80. Many Knowlton residents use Route 80 to commute to their jobs either further east in New Jersey or further west in Pennsylvania. Route 94 crosses through the township. Two bridges cross the Delaware River, connecting the township to Pennsylvania; the Portland–Columbia Toll Bridge, opened in 1953, connects Route 94 to Pennsylvania Route 611 in Portland, Pennsylvania. The two places are also connected by the Portland–Columbia Pedestrian Bridge, which dates back to a structure constructed in 1869 and was dedicated for pedestrian use when the vehicular toll bridge was completed in 1953.

Points of interest
 Brook Hollow Winery 
 DeVille's Historic Texaco

Notable people

People who were born in, residents of, or otherwise closely associated with Knowlton Township include:

 A. Elizabeth Adams (1892–1962), zoologist and professor at Mount Holyoke College
 Charles H. Flummerfelt (1863–1931), politician who served in the Washington House of Representatives and Washington State Senate
 Cornelius Edward Gallagher (1921–2018), politician who represented New Jersey's 13th congressional district in the United States House of Representatives from 1959 to 1973
 Philip Johnson (1818–1867), represented Pennsylvania in the United States House of Representatives from 1861 to 1867
 Jonathan Sonne, competitive Magic: The Gathering player
 William Henry Witte (1817–1876), member of the U.S. House of Representatives from Pennsylvania, serving from 1853 to 1855

References

External links

Knowlton Township website

 
1763 establishments in New Jersey
Populated places established in 1763
Township form of New Jersey government
Townships in Warren County, New Jersey
New Jersey populated places on the Delaware River